Viktor Wärnick (born 1991) is a Swedish politician. , he serves as Member of the Riksdag representing the constituency of Gävleborg County.

He was also elected as Member of the Riksdag in September 2022.

References 

Living people
1991 births
Place of birth missing (living people)
Members of the Riksdag from the Moderate Party
Members of the Riksdag 2018–2022
Members of the Riksdag 2022–2026
21st-century Swedish politicians